The Maritime Academy of Asia and the Pacific (MAAP) is a non-stock, non-profit maritime higher educational institution which is owned, developed and operated by the Associated Marine Officers’ and Seamen’s Union of the Philippines (AMOSUP). Its founding president, Capt. Gregorio S. Oca, alumnus of Philippine Nautical School (presently Philippine Merchant Marine Academy) headed the academy's board of governors, a group comprised by some of the organizations in the international maritime industry: the Filipino Association of Maritime Employers (FAME), the International Transport Workers’ Federation (ITF), the All Japan Seamen's Union, the Norwegian Seafarers’ Union (NSU), the  Limited (IMEC), the Danish Shipowners Association, the Norwegian Shipowners Association (NSA), Japanese Shipowners Association (JSA), and the International Mariners Management Association of Japan (IMMAJ). With their technical and financial support, the first MAAP campus opened in 1999.

The All-Japan Seamen's Union (JSU) and the International Mariners Management Association of Japan (IMMAJ) has partnered with MAAP to build a second facility within the academy grounds, the JSU-IMAAJ Campus.

History
The Maritime Academy of Asia and the Pacific (MAAP) was established on January 14, 1998, at Kamaya Point, Alas-asin, Mariveles, Bataan, in an  land. It was founded by Capt. Gregorio S. Oca, an alumnus of Philippine Nautical School (presently Philippine Merchant Marine Academy), chairman of the Associated Marine Officers and Seamen's Union of the Philippines (AMOSUP). Its inauguration on November 6, 1999, was attended by Philippine President Joseph Ejercito Estrada.

It is run by a governing board from the AMOSUP, the private sectors, the Danish Shipowners Association, the Norwegian Shipowners Association, the Japanese Shipowners Association, the All Japan Seamens' Union, the International Worker's Transport Federation, the International Maritime Employees Committee, and the Filipino Association of Mariner's Employment.

Two Japanese seafarer organizations, the All Japan Seamen's Union (JSU) and the International Mariners Management Association of Japan (IMMAJ), contributed to the construction of the new campus and was involved from then on with its operation. Hence, the additions to its initials "AJSU-IMMAJ Campus".

Facilities

The two campuses are located on Kamaya Point Road, on the southern slope of Mount Mariveles near the shore of Manila Bay facing Corregidor Island. Each has three main buildings: an academic building with classrooms, simulators, laboratories and a library; a dormitory with a capacity of 1,000; and a dining hall. Two Scandinavian-made simulators are housed in the academic buildings. The MAAP training dock is located at the end of Kamaya Point Road on the shore of the North Channel entrance of Manila Bay.

Summary of Facilities:
Navigation Simulator Complex with 360° field of vision on a platform each linked to Full Mission Engine Simulator
Chart/ECDIS Exercise Room
GMDSS Laboratory
Liquid Cargo Handling Simulator
Computer-based Propulsion Plant
Electrotech Laboratory
Machine Shop
Physics Laboratory
Chemistry Laboratory
Microwave VSAT System and 3 servers for Telecommunications & Internet Access
Computer Laboratory
Refrigeration/Air-conditioning Laboratory
Japanese Compact Ship Handling Simulator
Pneumatic/Hydraulic Laboratory
Electromechanical Systems & Automation Laboratory
Liquid Natural Gas Simulator
Fire Fighting Center
Vessel Training Center
Enclosed Lifeboat on Free Fall Davit
Chemical/Product Tanker Simulator
Language Laboratory
Modern Library with over 8,000 titles
Helicopter Underwater Escape Trainer
Demonstration Kitchen for culinary courses

Academic degrees
The academy awards the following degrees:

Bachelor of Science in Marine Transportation (BSMT)
Bachelor of Science in Marine Engineering (BSMarE)
Bachelor of Science in Marine Transportation and Engineering (BSMTE)

The academy also offers subsidiary and supplementary courses such as Cook's Course, Bridging Program, Trainings on Fire Fighting and Medical First-Aid.

Its ROTC program is supervised by officers from the Philippine Navy.

Its first graduates for the dual course (BSMTE) came from the Class of Valchirion (2009). Graduates of the said course are sponsored by Maersk Filipinas.

Training Ship
The TS Kapitan Felix Oca was launched by NKK Corporation as MS Seiun Maru in July 1968 in Yokohama, Japan. It was owned by first owned by Inter Pacific Lines Co.,Ltd. of Japan and utilized as a training ship.

In 1997, AMOSUP (Associated Marine Officers and Seamen's Union of the Philippines) acquired the training ship M.V. Seiun Maru from the Ministry of Transport of Japan. It was delivered in Manila on November 19, 1997, and placed under the Philippine flag with the vessel name “T/S Kapitan Felix Oca“.

It was designated as a Philippine Navy Affiliated Reserve Unit (PNARU) on September 24, 1999.

The TSKFO is equipped with a training bridge with actual navigation instruments, engine lecture room, engine exercise room and automated engine control room.

See also 
Cadet rank in the Philippines

References

External links

www.maap.edu.ph
http://www.km.kongsberg.com

1998 establishments in the Philippines
Educational institutions established in 1998
Maritime colleges
Universities and colleges in Bataan